Ypsolopha diana is a moth of the family Ypsolophidae. It is known from China.

References

Ypsolophidae
Moths of Asia